Cyrestis maenalis, the common mapwing, is a species of butterfly of the family Nymphalidae. It is found in South-East Asia.

Subspecies
Cyrestis maenalis martini Hartert, 1902 (Peninsular Malaya)
Cyrestis maenalis maenalis (northern Philippines)
Cyrestis maenalis negros Martin, 1903 (Philippines: Negros)
Cyrestis maenalis nigrolineata van Eecke, 1914 (Simalue)
Cyrestis maenalis obscurior Staudinger, 1889 (Philippines: Palawan, Balabac)
Cyrestis maenalis oebasius Fruhstorfer, 1913 (Philippines: Mindanao)
Cyrestis maenalis peropaca Hanafusa, 1993 (Indonesia: Mentawai Islands)
Cyrestis maenalis rothschildi Martin, 1903 (Philippines: Mindoro)
Cyrestis maenalis seminigra Grose-Smith, 1889 (northern Borneo
Cyrestis maenalis subobscurus Swinhoe, 1908 (Nias)
Cyrestis maenalis zamboangensis Jumalon, 1975 (Philippines: western Mindanao)

Gallery

References

Butterflies described in 1834
Cyrestinae
Butterflies of Borneo